= Privé Jets =

Privé Jets is a private company that brokers air transportation and luxury private charters. The company has over 7,000 aircraft in its network and access to 50,000 airports worldwide. The company is headquartered in Hallandale, Florida. In 2012, Privé Jets was named to the Inc. 5000. As of 2017, the company had made the list for six consecutive years. It had $28.5 million in annual revenues in 2005, according to Inc.

== Background ==
In 2010, it launched the Jet Setter Program to provide charter services. Privé Jets partnered with the Forest Travel Agency. In 2011, Privé Jets was selected as the official charter for the Bancolombia Exhibition Match and transported Rafael Nadal and Novak Djokovic to Colombia for the event. Privé Jets is a member of Virtuoso. In 2018, it launched Custom Jet Cards, a new type of jet card product that provides users with fixed rates and guaranteed availability based on their specific flying needs.

== Recognition ==
In 2011, Privé Jets ranked #547 on the Inc. 5000 list of America's Fastest-Growing Companies. It also was ranked #12 on the Inc. Logistics and Transportation list. In 2012, Prive Jets ranked #665 on the Inc. 5000 list. In 2012, Privé Jets was nominated for the World Travel Award's North American Leading Private Jet Charter. In January 2019, Prive Jets was named North America's Leading Private Jet Charter by the World Travel Awards for the fourth time and second consecutive year.
